A circumfix (abbreviated ) (also confix or ambifix) is an affix which has two parts, one placed at the start of a word, and the other at the end.  Circumfixes contrast with prefixes, attached to the beginnings of words; suffixes, attached at the end; and infixes, inserted in the middle. Circumfixes are common in Malay and Georgian.

Examples 

 are used to mark off circumfixes.

Germanic languages
The circumfix is probably most widely known from the German past participle, which is ge--t (ge- prefix + -t suffix) for regular verbs. The verb spiel-en, for example, has the participle ge-spiel-t. Dutch has a similar system (spel-en → ge-speel-d in this case). In Dutch, the circumfix ge--te (ge- prefix + -te suffix) can be used to form certain collective nouns (berg (mountain) → ge-berg-te (mountain range)).

East Asian languages
In Japanese, some linguists consider o--ni naru (o- honorific prefix + ni particle + verb naru) and o--suru (o- prefix + -suru suffix/verb suru) to be honorific circumfixes; for example yom-u (′read′) ...→ o--ni naru (respectful), o--suru (humble).

In addition, Old Japanese had a prohibitive construction na--so2(ne) (where the bracketed ne is optional), which at least one linguist (ja) considers to be a circumfixal word form; an example using the Old Japanese verb ′write′ (kak-u) would be na--so2(ne).  The form without the bracketed ne survived marginally into Early Middle Japanese, but has no equivalent in any modern Japanese dialect or any other Japonic language.  Instead, all modern Japonic languages and dialects express the prohibitive with a suffixal particle na (which is probably related to the prefixal part of the Old Japanese construction) attached to a non-past form of the verb; e.g., Tōkyō Japanese ku-na, Kyōto Japanese ka-na, Kagoshima Japanese kaʔ- or kan-, Hachijō kaku-na, Yamatohama Amami kʰakʰu-na, Nakijin Kunigami hḁkˀu:-, Shuri Okinawan , Irabu Miyakoan kafï-na, Hateruma Yaeyaman hḁku-na, and Yonaguni kʰagu-n-na (all ′don't write!′).  In addition to the circumfixal forms, Old Japanese also had a suffixal form similar to the modern forms (e.g., kak-u-na), as well as a prefixal form na-kak-i1, which is also not reflected in any modern Japonic variety.

Austronesian languages
Malay has eight circumfixes:
 per--kan
 per--i
 ber--an
 ke--an
 pen--an
 per--an
 se--nya
 ke--i

For example, the circumfix ke--an can be added to the root adil "fair/just" to form ke-adil-an "fairness/justice".

Other languages
In most North African and some Levantine varieties of Arabic, verbs are negated by placing the circumfix maš around the verb together with all its prefixes and suffixed direct- and indirect-object pronouns. For example, Egyptian bitgibuhum-laha "you bring them to her" is negated as maš "you don't bring them to her".

In Berber languages the feminine is marked with the circumfix tt. The word afus "hand" becomes tt. In Kabyle, θθ "bride" derives from issli "groom". From bni, to build, with tt we obtain tbnit "thou buildest". 

Negation in Guaraní is also done with circumfixes, ndi and ndmo'ãi for future negation.

In some Slavic languages, and in Hungarian, the superlative of adjectives is formed with a circumfix. For example, in Czech, the circumfix nejší is used – mladý "young" becomes nejmladší "youngest". The corresponding circumfix in Hungarian is legbb, as in legnagyobb "biggest", from nagy "big". (In both cases, the comparative form is produced using the suffix without the prefix: mladší "younger"; nagyobb "bigger".) 

In Gurmanchema and Wolof, noun classes are indicated by circumfix.

See also 
Circumposition
 Silent (or magic) e, a discontiguous digraph in English
Epenthesis

References 

Affixes